Eyüp Can (born August 3, 1964 in Pınarbaşı, Cihanbeyli) is a retired Turkish boxer.  He won a Flyweight Bronze medal at the 1984 Summer Olympics, losing in the semi final to eventual gold medalist Steve McCrory. Two years later, he won the bronze medal at the 1986 World Amateur Boxing Championships in Reno, United States.

Olympic results 
Defeated Bill Dunlop (Canada) 5-0
Defeated Seiki Segawa (Japan) 4-1
Defeated Huh Yong-Mo (South Korea) 4-1
Lost to Steve McCrory (United States) 0-5

Pro career
Can began his professional career in 1986 and had limited success, losing his only defining fight, a decision loss to former WBA Light Flyweight title holder Joey Olivo. He retired in 1992 with a record of 15-1-0.

References

External links
 

1964 births
People from Cihanbeyli
Living people
Flyweight boxers
Olympic boxers of Turkey
Boxers at the 1984 Summer Olympics
Olympic bronze medalists for Turkey
Olympic medalists in boxing
Turkish male boxers
AIBA World Boxing Championships medalists
Medalists at the 1984 Summer Olympics
20th-century Turkish people